Roger Wehrli (born 18 March 1956) is a Swiss former professional football player and manager who played as a midfielder.

References

1956 births
Living people
Swiss men's footballers
Association football midfielders
Switzerland international footballers
FC Baden players
FC Winterthur players
Grasshopper Club Zürich players
FC Luzern players
FC Aarau players
Swiss Super League players
Swiss football managers
FC Aarau managers